Lennox Island 5 is a Mi'kmaq reserve located in Prince County, Prince Edward Island. There are currently no residents.

It is administratively part of the Lennox Island First Nation.

History 
The Mi'kmaq have inhabited the lands comprising present-day Prince Edward Island for over 10,000 years.

The reserve named Lennox Island 1 is notable for being the first reserve in Canada owned by its people, having been purchased in 1878 by the Aboriginal Protection Society.

The land known as Lennox Island 5 was acquired by the Lennox Island First Nation in the early 2000s.

References 

Indian reserves in Prince Edward Island
Communities in Prince County, Prince Edward Island
Mi'kmaq in Canada